Ternii Truda (Thorns of Labour) was a Bolshevik legal weekly newspaper published in St. Petersburg, Russia, from  to . Vladimir Lenin was an active collaborator. All the issues were confiscated by the police and further publication was prohibited by the St. Petersburg City Court.

References

Russian-language newspapers
Newspapers published in Russia
Socialist newspapers
Publications established in 1906
Publications disestablished in 1907
Mass media in Saint Petersburg
Defunct weekly newspapers
Defunct newspapers published in Russia
1906 establishments in the Russian Empire
1907 disestablishments in the Russian Empire